Martijn Jaspers (born 11 February 1987) is a Dutch male BMX rider, representing his nation at international competitions. He competed in the time trial event at the 2015 UCI BMX World Championships.

References

External links
 
 
 

1987 births
Living people
BMX riders
Dutch male cyclists
Place of birth missing (living people)
20th-century Dutch people
21st-century Dutch people